2400 series may refer to:

Train types 

 CTA 2400 series electric multiple unit formerly operating for the Chicago Transit Authority
 Keihan 2400 series electric multiple unit operating for Keihan Electric Railway
 Kintetsu 2400 series electric multiple unit operating for Kintetsu Railway since 1966
 Odakyu 2400 series electric multiple unit formerly operating for Odakyu Electric Railway from 1960-1989

Electric multiple units of Japan
Disambiguation pages
Chicago "L" rolling stock